Potamides were a type of water nymph of Greco-Roman mythology. They were assigned to a class of nymphs of fresh water known as naiads and as such belonged to a category that presided over rivers and streams.

Origin and abode
Potamides were identified by the names associated with the rivers of their origin such as the Anigrides, Ismenides, Amnisiades, the Pactolides from the Pactolus river, and the Acheloides from the Achelous river. However they had their individual names and also sometimes could be distinguished  by the name of the country in which they inhabited.

The rivers were the domains of potamides as well as of the nymphs Fluviales. Every creek had its potamide, who as local divinities, and like all the naiads, were daughters of the gods of rivers, also called Potamoi. Even the rivers of the marshy regions are described as having their nymphs; hence no exception was made to the waters of Greek underworld ruled by god Hades, as was quoted in Latin: "Nymphae infernae paludis and Avernales", which means "swampy Avernales, the infernal nymphs". And many of these hellish potamides, the Avernales, were believed to be owners of prophetic ability, and to express that gift to their chosen men.

Characteristics and worship
Like any nymph, potamides were considered subject to mortality but with a long life. For the Greek historian Plutarch their term of life reached about 9720 years, and according to Greek poet Hesiod there were about three thousand nymphs wandering on the world, and their lives lasted several thousand years.

Potamides showed themselves very favorably inclined to young girls and gently removed the freckles from all who bathed in their streams. On the other hand, they had an aggressive behavior directed at young men coming near their watery territories, whom they dragged down to their abodes. It was believed by the ancients that they carried water for their river parents, as was quoted: "In the lonely hour of noon the naiads sat with their water-pitcher at the spring-sending forth from it the warbling brook."

Regarded as a profuse class of minor female divinities, they were believed to inspire those that drank of their waters. Thus potamides, and nymphs in general, were conceived to be endowed with oracular power, to inspire men with the same prophetic gift, and to bestow upon them the natural talent of poetry. Hence, as water is a necessity to all the creation, the water nymphs, along with the gods Dionysus and Demeter, were also worshiped as providing life and blessings to all existing beings and this attribute is manifested by a diversity of epithets.

Accordingly, in many parts of Greece, offerings of honey, oil, milk, but never of wine, and sometimes sacrifices of a lamb or goat were presented to these divinities. In Sicily was commemorated an annual celebration in their honor. Although they had no temples, the most beautiful spots in forests, gardens, and so forth, were regarded as the favorite places of nymphs and invisible spirits and thus esteemed with special veneration.

See also
Camenae
Fontus
Morgens
Nix

Notes

References